

Events

Pre-1600
404 BC – Admiral Lysander and King Pausanias of Sparta blockade Athens and bring the Peloponnesian War to a successful conclusion.
 775 – The Battle of Bagrevand puts an end to an Armenian rebellion against the Abbasid Caliphate. Muslim control over the South Caucasus is solidified and its Islamization begins, while several major Armenian nakharar families lose power and their remnants flee to the Byzantine Empire.
 799 – After mistreatment and disfigurement by the citizens of Rome, Pope Leo III flees to the Frankish court of king Charlemagne at Paderborn for protection.
1134 – The name Zagreb was mentioned for the first time in the Felician Charter relating to the establishment of the Zagreb Bishopric around 1094.

1601–1900
1607 – Eighty Years' War: The Dutch fleet destroys the anchored Spanish fleet at Gibraltar.
1644 – Transition from Ming to Qing: The Chongzhen Emperor, the last Emperor of Ming China, commits suicide during a peasant rebellion led by Li Zicheng.
1707 – A coalition of Britain, the Netherlands and Portugal is defeated by a Franco-Spanish army at Almansa (Spain) in the War of the Spanish Succession.
1792 – Highwayman Nicolas J. Pelletier becomes the first person executed by guillotine.
  1792   – "La Marseillaise" (the French national anthem) is composed by Claude Joseph Rouget de Lisle.
1829 – Charles Fremantle arrives in HMS Challenger off the coast of modern-day Western Australia prior to declaring the Swan River Colony for the British Empire.
1846 – Thornton Affair: Open conflict begins over the disputed border of Texas, triggering the Mexican–American War.
1849 – The Governor General of Canada, Lord Elgin, signs the Rebellion Losses Bill, outraging Montreal's English population and triggering the Montreal Riots.
1859 – British and French engineers break ground for the Suez Canal.
1862 – American Civil War: Forces under U.S. Admiral David Farragut demand the surrender of the Confederate city of New Orleans, Louisiana.
1864 – American Civil War: In the Battle of Marks' Mills, a force of 8,000 Confederate soldiers attacks 1,800 Union soldiers and a large number of wagon teamsters, killing or wounding 1,500 Union combatants.
1882 – French and Vietnamese troops clashed in Tonkin, when Commandant Henri Rivière seized the citadel of Hanoi with a small force of marine infantry.
1898 – Spanish–American War: The United States Congress declares that a state of war between the U.S. and Spain has existed since April 21, when an American naval blockade of the Spanish colony of Cuba began.

1901–present
1901 – New York becomes the first U.S. state to require automobile license plates.
1915 – World War I: The Battle of Gallipoli begins: The invasion of the Turkish Gallipoli Peninsula by British, French, Indian, Newfoundland, Australian and New Zealand troops, begins with landings at Anzac Cove and Cape Helles.
1916 – Anzac Day is commemorated for the first time on the first anniversary of the landing at ANZAC Cove.
1920 – At the San Remo conference, the principal Allied Powers of World War I adopt a resolution to determine the allocation of Class "A" League of Nations mandates for administration of the former Ottoman-ruled lands of the Middle East.
1938 – U.S. Supreme Court delivers its opinion in Erie Railroad Co. v. Tompkins and overturns a century of federal common law.
1944 – The United Negro College Fund is incorporated.
1945 – Elbe Day: United States and Soviet reconnaissance troops meet in Torgau and Strehla along the River Elbe, cutting the Wehrmacht of Nazi Germany in two.
  1945   – Liberation Day (Italy): The National Liberation Committee for Northern Italy calls for a general uprising against the German occupation and the Italian Social Republic.
  1945   – United Nations Conference on International Organization: Founding negotiations for the United Nations begin in San Francisco.
  1945   – The last German troops retreat from Finland's soil in Lapland, ending the Lapland War. Military acts of Second World War end in Finland.
1951 – Korean War: Assaulting Chinese forces are forced to withdraw after heavy fighting with UN forces, primarily made up of Australian and Canadian troops, at the Battle of Kapyong.
1953 – Francis Crick and James Watson publish "Molecular Structure of Nucleic Acids: A Structure for Deoxyribose Nucleic Acid" describing the double helix structure of DNA.
1954 – The first practical solar cell is publicly demonstrated by Bell Telephone Laboratories.
1959 – The Saint Lawrence Seaway, linking the North American Great Lakes and the Atlantic Ocean, officially opens to shipping.
1960 – The United States Navy submarine  completes the first submerged circumnavigation of the globe.
1961 – Robert Noyce is granted a patent for an integrated circuit.
1972 – Vietnam War: Nguyen Hue Offensive: The North Vietnamese 320th Division forces 5,000 South Vietnamese troops to retreat and traps about 2,500 others northwest of Kontum.
1974 – Carnation Revolution: A leftist military coup in Portugal overthrows the authoritarian-conservative Estado Novo regime and establishes a democratic government.
1980 – One hundred forty-six people are killed when Dan-Air Flight 1008 crashes near Los Rodeos Airport in Tenerife, Canary Islands.
1981 – More than 100 workers are exposed to radiation during repairs of at the Tsuruga Nuclear Power Plant in Japan.
1982 – Israel completes its withdrawal from the Sinai Peninsula per the Camp David Accords.
1983 – Cold War: American schoolgirl Samantha Smith is invited to visit the Soviet Union by its leader Yuri Andropov after he read her letter in which she expressed fears about nuclear war.
  1983   – Pioneer 10 travels beyond Pluto's orbit.
1990 – Violeta Chamorro takes office as the President of Nicaragua, the first woman to hold the position.
2001 – President George W. Bush pledges U.S. military support in the event of a Chinese attack on Taiwan. 
2004 – The March for Women's Lives brings between 500,000 and 800,000 protesters, mostly pro-choice, to Washington D.C. to protest the Partial-Birth Abortion Ban Act of 2003, and other restrictions on abortion. 
2005 – The final piece of the Obelisk of Axum is returned to Ethiopia after being stolen by the invading Italian army in 1937.
  2005   – A seven-car commuter train derails and crashes into an apartment building near Amagasaki Station in Japan, killing 107, including the driver.
  2005   – Bulgaria and Romania sign the Treaty of Accession 2005 to join the European Union.
2007 – Boris Yeltsin's funeral: The first to be sanctioned by the Russian Orthodox Church for a head of state since the funeral of Emperor Alexander III in 1894.
2014 – The Flint water crisis begins when officials at Flint, Michigan switch the city's water supply to the Flint River, leading to lead and bacteria contamination upon the citizens.
2015 – Nearly 9,100 are killed after a massive 7.8 magnitude earthquake strikes Nepal.

Births

Pre-1600
1214 – Louis IX of France (d. 1270)
1228 – Conrad IV of Germany (d. 1254)
1284 – Edward II of England (d. 1327)
1287 – Roger Mortimer, 1st Earl of March, English politician, Lord Lieutenant of Ireland (d. 1330)
1502 – Georg Major, German theologian and academic (d. 1574)
1529 – Francesco Patrizi, Italian philosopher and scientist (d. 1597)
1599 – Oliver Cromwell, English general and politician, Lord Protector of Great Britain (d. 1658)

1601–1900
1621 – Roger Boyle, 1st Earl of Orrery, English soldier and politician (d. 1679)
1666 – Johann Heinrich Buttstett, German organist and composer (d. 1727)
1694 – Richard Boyle, 3rd Earl of Burlington, English architect and politician, Lord High Treasurer of Ireland (d. 1753)
1710 – James Ferguson, Scottish astronomer and author (d. 1776)
1723 – Giovanni Marco Rutini, Italian composer (d. 1797)
1725 – Augustus Keppel, 1st Viscount Keppel, English admiral and politician (d. 1786)
1767 – Nicolas Oudinot, French general (d. 1847)
1770 – Georg Sverdrup, Norwegian philologist and academic (d. 1850)
1776 – Princess Mary, Duchess of Gloucester and Edinburgh (d. 1857)
1843 – Princess Alice of the United Kingdom (d. 1878)
1849 – Felix Klein, German mathematician and academic (d. 1925)
1850 – Luise Adolpha Le Beau, German composer and educator (d. 1927)
1851 – Leopoldo Alas, Spanish author, critic, and academic (d. 1901)
1854 – Charles Sumner Tainter, American engineer and inventor (d. 1940)
1862 – Edward Grey, 1st Viscount Grey of Fallodon, English ornithologist and politician, Secretary of State for Foreign and Commonwealth Affairs (d. 1933)
1868 – John Moisant, American pilot and engineer (d. 1910)
1871 – Lorne Currie, French-English sailor (d. 1926)
1872 – C. B. Fry, English cricketer, footballer, educator, and politician (d. 1956)
1873 – Walter de la Mare, English poet, short story writer, and novelist (d. 1956)
  1873   – Howard Garis, American author, creator of the Uncle Wiggily series of children's stories (d. 1962)
1874 – Guglielmo Marconi, Italian businessman and inventor, developed Marconi's law, Nobel Prize laureate (d. 1937)
  1874   – Ernest Webb, English-Canadian race walker (d. 1937)
1876 – Jacob Nicol, Canadian publisher, lawyer, and politician (d. 1958)
1878 – William Merz, American gymnast and triathlete (d. 1946)
1882 – Fred McLeod, Scottish golfer (d. 1976)
1887 – Kojo Tovalou Houénou, Beninese lawyer and critic (d. 1936)
1892 – Maud Hart Lovelace, American author (d. 1980)
1896 – Fred Haney, American baseball player, coach, and manager (d. 1977)
1897 – Mary, Princess Royal and Countess of Harewood (d. 1965)
1900 – Gladwyn Jebb, English politician and diplomat, Secretary-General of the United Nations (d. 1996)
  1900   – Wolfgang Pauli, Austrian-Swiss-American physicist and academic, Nobel Prize laureate (d. 1958)

1901–present
1902 – Werner Heyde, German psychiatrist and academic (d. 1964)
  1902   – Mary Miles Minter, American actress (d. 1984)
1903 – Andrey Kolmogorov, Russian mathematician and academic (d. 1987)
1905 – George Nēpia, New Zealand rugby player and referee (d. 1986)
1906 – William J. Brennan Jr., American colonel and Associate Justice of the United States Supreme Court (d. 1997)
1908 – Edward R. Murrow, American journalist (d. 1965)
1909 – William Pereira, American architect, designed the Transamerica Pyramid (d. 1985)
1910 – Arapeta Awatere,  New Zealand interpreter, military leader, politician, and murderer (d. 1976)
1911 – Connie Marrero, Cuban baseball player and coach (d. 2014)
1912 – Earl Bostic, African-American saxophonist (d. 1965)
1913 – Nikolaos Roussen, Greek captain (d. 1944)
1914 – Ross Lockridge Jr., American author and academic (d. 1948)
1915 – Mort Weisinger, American journalist and author (d. 1978)
1916 – Jerry Barber, American golfer (d. 1994)
1917 – Ella Fitzgerald, American singer (d. 1996)
  1917   – Jean Lucas, French racing driver (d. 2003)
1918 – Graham Payn, South African-born English actor and singer (d. 2005)
  1918   – Gérard de Vaucouleurs, French-American astronomer and academic (d. 1995)
  1918   – Astrid Varnay, Swedish-American soprano and actress (d. 2006)
1919 – Finn Helgesen, Norwegian speed skater (d. 2011)
1921 – Karel Appel, Dutch painter and sculptor (d. 2006)
1923 – Francis Graham-Smith, English astronomer and academic
  1923   – Melissa Hayden, Canadian ballerina (d. 2006)
  1923   – Albert King, African-American singer-songwriter, guitarist, and producer (d. 1992)
1924 – Ingemar Johansson, Swedish race walker (d. 2009)
  1924   – Franco Mannino, Italian pianist, composer, director, and playwright (d. 2005)
  1924   – Paulo Vanzolini, Brazilian singer-songwriter and zoologist (d. 2013)
1925 – Tony Christopher, Baron Christopher, English trade union leader and businessman
  1925   – Sammy Drechsel, German comedian and journalist (d. 1986)
  1925   – Louis O'Neil, Canadian academic and politician (d. 2018)
1926 – Johnny Craig, American author and illustrator (d. 2001)
  1926   – Gertrude Fröhlich-Sandner, Austrian politician (d. 2008)
  1926   – Patricia Castell, Argentine actress (d. 2013)
1927 – Corín Tellado, Spanish author (d. 2009)
  1927   – Albert Uderzo, French author and illustrator (d. 2020)
1928 – Cy Twombly, American-Italian painter and sculptor (d. 2011)
1929 – Yvette Williams, New Zealand long jumper, shot putter, and discus thrower (d. 2019)
1930 – Paul Mazursky, American actor, director, and screenwriter (d. 2014)
  1930   – Godfrey Milton-Thompson, English admiral and surgeon (d. 2012)
  1930   – Peter Schulz, German lawyer and politician, Mayor of Hamburg (d. 2013)
1931 – Felix Berezin, Russian mathematician and physicist (d. 1980)
  1931   – David Shepherd, English painter and author (d. 2017) 
1932 – Nikolai Kardashev, Russian astrophysicist (d. 2019)
  1932   – Meadowlark Lemon, African-American basketball player and minister (d. 2015) 
  1932   – Lia Manoliu, Romanian discus thrower and politician (d. 1998)
1933 – Jerry Leiber, American songwriter and producer (d. 2011)
  1933   – Joyce Ricketts, American baseball player (d. 1992)
1934 – Peter McParland, Northern Irish footballer and manager
1935 – Bob Gutowski, American pole vaulter (d. 1960)
  1935   – Reinier Kreijermaat, Dutch footballer (d. 2018)
1936 – Henck Arron, Surinamese banker and politician, 1st Prime Minister of the Republic of Suriname (d. 2000)
1938 – Roger Boisjoly, American aerodynamicist and engineer (d. 2012)
  1938   – Ton Schulten, Dutch painter and graphic designer
1939 – Tarcisio Burgnich, Italian footballer and manager (d. 2021)
  1939   – Michael Llewellyn-Smith, English academic and diplomat
  1939   – Robert Skidelsky, Baron Skidelsky, English historian and academic
  1939   – Veronica Sutherland, English academic and British diplomat
1940 – Al Pacino, American actor and director
1941 – Bertrand Tavernier, French actor, director, producer, and screenwriter (d. 2021)
1942 – Jon Kyl, American lawyer and politician
1943 – Tony Christie, English singer-songwriter and actor
1944 – Len Goodman, English dancer
  1944   – Mike Kogel, German singer-songwriter
  1944   – Stephen Nickell, English economist and academic
  1944   – Bruce Ponder, English geneticist and cancer researcher 
1945 – Stu Cook, American bass player, songwriter, and producer 
  1945   – Richard C. Hoagland, American theorist and author
  1945   – Björn Ulvaeus, Swedish singer-songwriter and producer 
1946 – Talia Shire, American actress 
  1946   – Peter Sutherland, Irish lawyer and politician, Attorney General of Ireland (d. 2018)
  1946   – Vladimir Zhirinovsky, Russian colonel, lawyer, and politician (d. 2022)
1947 – Johan Cruyff, Dutch footballer and manager (d. 2016)
  1947   – Jeffrey DeMunn, American actor
  1947   – Cathy Smith, Canadian singer and drug dealer (d. 2020)
1948 – Mike Selvey, English cricketer and sportscaster
  1948   – Yu Shyi-kun, Taiwanese politician, 39th Premier of the Republic of China
1949 – Vicente Pernía, Argentinian footballer and race car driver
  1949   – Dominique Strauss-Kahn, French economist, lawyer, and politician, French Minister of Finance
  1949   – James Fenton, English poet, journalist and literary critic
1950 – Donnell Deeny, Northern Irish lawyer and judge  
  1950   – Steve Ferrone, English drummer 
  1950   – Peter Hintze, German politician (d. 2016)
  1950   – Valentyna Kozyr, Ukrainian high jumper
1951 – Ian McCartney, Scottish politician, Minister of State for Trade
1952 – Ketil Bjørnstad, Norwegian pianist and composer
  1952   – Vladislav Tretiak, Russian ice hockey player and coach
  1952   – Jacques Santini, French footballer and coach
1953 – Ron Clements, American animator, producer, and screenwriter
  1953   – Gary Cosier, Australian cricketer
  1953   – Anthony Venables, English economist, author, and academic
1954 – Melvin Burgess, English author
  1954   – Randy Cross, American football player and sportscaster
  1954   – Róisín Shortall, Irish educator and politician
1955 – Américo Gallego, Argentinian footballer and coach
  1955   – Parviz Parastui, Iranian actor and singer
  1955   – Zev Siegl, American businessman, co-founded Starbucks
1956 – Dominique Blanc, French actress, director, and screenwriter
  1956   – Abdalla Uba Adamu, Nigerian professor, media scholar
1957 – Theo de Rooij, Dutch cyclist and manager
1958 – Fish, Scottish singer-songwriter 
  1958   – Misha Glenny, British journalist
1959 – Paul Madden, English diplomat, British High Commissioner to Australia
  1959   – Daniel Kash, Canadian actor and director
  1959   – Tony Phillips, American baseball player (d. 2016)
1960 – Paul Baloff, American singer (d. 2002)
  1960   – Robert Peston, English journalist 
1961 – Dinesh D'Souza, Indian-American journalist and author
  1961   – Miran Tepeš, Slovenian ski jumper 
1962 – Foeke Booy, Dutch footballer and manager
1963 – Joy Covey, American businesswoman (d. 2013)
  1963   – Dave Martin, English footballer
  1963   – David Moyes, Scottish footballer and manager
  1963   – Bernd Müller, German footballer and manager
  1963   – Paul Wassif, English singer-songwriter and guitarist
1964 – Hank Azaria, American actor, voice artist, comedian and producer
  1964   – Andy Bell, English singer-songwriter
1965 – Eric Avery, American bass player and songwriter 
  1965   – Mark Bryant, American basketball player and coach
  1965   – John Henson, American puppeteer and voice actor (d. 2014)
1966 – Diego Domínguez, Argentinian-Italian rugby player
  1966   – Femke Halsema, Dutch sociologist, academic, and politician
  1966   – Darren Holmes, American baseball player and coach
  1966   – Erik Pappas, American baseball player and coach
1967 – Angel Martino, American swimmer
1968 – Vitaliy Kyrylenko, Ukrainian long jumper
  1968   – Thomas Strunz, German footballer 
1969 – Joe Buck, American sportscaster
  1969   – Martin Koolhoven, Dutch director and screenwriter
  1969   – Jon Olsen, American swimmer
  1969   – Darren Woodson, American football player and sportscaster
  1969   – Renée Zellweger, American actress and producer
1970 – Jason Lee, American skateboarder, actor, comedian and producer
1971 – Sara Baras, Spanish dancer
  1971   – Brad Clontz, American baseball player
1973 – Carlota Castrejana, Spanish triple jumper
  1973   – Fredrik Larzon, Swedish drummer 
  1973   – Barbara Rittner, German tennis player 
1975 – Jacque Jones, American baseball player and coach
1976 – Gilberto da Silva Melo, Brazilian footballer
  1976   – Tim Duncan, American basketball player
  1976   – Breyton Paulse, South African rugby player
  1976   – Rainer Schüttler, German tennis player and coach
1977 – Constantinos Christoforou, Cypriot singer-songwriter 
  1977   – Ilias Kotsios, Greek footballer
  1977   – Marguerite Moreau, American actress and producer
  1977   – Matthew West, American singer-songwriter, guitarist, and actor
1978 – Matt Walker, English swimmer
1980 – Ben Johnston, Scottish drummer and songwriter
  1980   – James Johnston, Scottish bass player and songwriter 
  1980   – Daniel MacPherson, Australian actor and television host
  1980   – Bruce Martin, New Zealand cricketer
  1980   – Kazuhito Tadano, Japanese baseball player
  1980   – Alejandro Valverde, Spanish cyclist
1981 – Dwone Hicks, American football player
  1981   – Felipe Massa, Brazilian racing driver
  1981   – John McFall, English sprinter
  1981   – Anja Pärson, Swedish skier
1982 – Brian Barton, American baseball player
  1982   – Monty Panesar, English cricketer
  1982   – Marco Russo, Italian footballer
1983 – Johnathan Thurston, Australian rugby league player
  1983   – DeAngelo Williams, American football player
1984 – Robert Andino, American baseball player
  1984   – Isaac Kiprono Songok, Kenyan runner
1985 – Giedo van der Garde, Dutch racing driver
1986 – Alexei Emelin, Russian ice hockey player
  1986   – Thin Seng Hon, Cambodian Paralympic athlete
  1986   – Gwen Jorgensen, American triathlete
  1986   – Claudia Rath, German heptathlete
1987 – Razak Boukari, Togolese footballer
  1987   – Jay Park, American-South Korean singer-songwriter and dancer 
  1987   – Johann Smith, American soccer player
1988 – James Sheppard, Canadian ice hockey player
1989 – Marie-Michèle Gagnon, Canadian skier
  1989   – Michael van Gerwen, Dutch darts player
  1989   – Gedhun Choekyi Nyima, the 11th Panchen Lama
1990 – Jean-Éric Vergne, French racing driver
  1990   – Taylor Walker, Australian footballer
1991 – Alex Shibutani, American ice dancer
1993 – Alex Bowman, American race car driver
  1993   – Daniel Norris, American baseball player
1994 – Omar McLeod, Jamaican hurdler
1995 – Lewis Baker, English footballer
1996 – Mack Horton, Australian swimmer
1997 – Julius Ertlthaler, Austrian footballer

Deaths

Pre-1600
 501 – Rusticus, saint and archbishop of Lyon (b. 455)
 775 – Smbat VII Bagratuni, Armenian prince
   775   – Mushegh VI Mamikonian, Armenian prince
 908 – Zhang Wenwei, Chinese chancellor
1074 – Herman I, Margrave of Baden
1077 – Géza I of Hungary (b. 1040)
1185 – Emperor Antoku of Japan (b. 1178)
1217 – Hermann I, Landgrave of Thuringia
1228 – Queen Isabella II of Jerusalem (b. 1212)
1243 – Boniface of Valperga, Bishop of Aosta
1264 – Roger de Quincy, 2nd Earl of Winchester, medieval English nobleman; Earl of Winchester (b. 1195)
1295 – Sancho IV of Castile (b. 1258)
1342 – Pope Benedict XII (b. 1285)
1397 – Thomas Holland, 2nd Earl of Kent, English nobleman 
1472 – Leon Battista Alberti, Italian author, poet, and philosopher (b. 1404)
1516 – John Yonge, English diplomat (b. 1467)
1566 – Louise Labé, French poet and author (b. 1520)
  1566   – Diane de Poitiers, mistress of King Henry II of France (b. 1499)
1595 – Torquato Tasso, Italian poet and songwriter (b. 1544)

1601–1900
1605 – Naresuan, Siamese King of Ayutthaya Kingdom (b. c. 1555)
1644 – Chongzhen Emperor of China (b. 1611)
1660 – Henry Hammond, English cleric and theologian (b. 1605)
1690 – David Teniers the Younger, Flemish painter and educator (b. 1610)
1744 – Anders Celsius, Swedish astronomer, physicist, and mathematician (b. 1701)
1770 – Jean-Antoine Nollet, French minister, physicist, and academic (b. 1700)
1800 – William Cowper, English poet (b. 1731)
1840 – Siméon Denis Poisson, French mathematician and physicist (b. 1781)
1873 – Fyodor Petrovich Tolstoy, Russian painter and sculptor (b. 1783)
1875 – 12th Dalai Lama (b. 1857)
1878 – Anna Sewell, English author (b. 1820)
1890 – Crowfoot, Canadian tribal chief (b. 1830)
1891 – Nathaniel Woodard, English priest and educator (b. 1811)
1892 – Henri Duveyrier, French explorer (b. 1840)
  1892   – Karl von Ditmar, Estonian-German geologist and explorer (b. 1822)

1901–present
1906 – John Knowles Paine, American composer and educator (b. 1839)
1911 – Emilio Salgari, Italian journalist and author (b. 1862)
1913 – Joseph-Alfred Archambeault, Canadian bishop (b. 1859)
1915 – Frederick W. Seward, American journalist, lawyer, and politician, 6th United States Assistant Secretary of State (b. 1830)
1919 – Augustus D. Juilliard, American businessman and philanthropist (b. 1836)
1921 – Emmeline B. Wells, American journalist and women's rights advocate (b. 1828)
1923 – Louis-Olivier Taillon, Canadian lawyer and politician, 8th Premier of Quebec (b. 1840)
1928 – Pyotr Nikolayevich Wrangel, Russian general (b. 1878)
1936 – Wajed Ali Khan Panni, Bengali aristocrat and philanthropist (b. 1871)
1941 – Salih Bozok, Turkish commander and politician (b. 1881)
1943 – Vladimir Nemirovich-Danchenko, Russian director, producer, and playwright (b. 1858)
1944 – George Herriman, American cartoonist (b. 1880)
  1944   – Tony Mullane, Irish-American baseball player (b. 1859)
  1944   – William Stephens, American engineer and politician, 24th Governor of California (b. 1859)
1945 – Huldreich Georg Früh, Swiss composer (b. 1903)
1961 – Robert Garrett, American discus thrower and shot putter (b. 1875)
1970 – Anita Louise, American actress (b. 1915)
1972 – George Sanders, English actor (b. 1906)
1973 – Olga Grey, Hungarian-American actress (b. 1896)
1974 – Gustavo R. Vincenti, Maltese architect and developer (b. 1888)
1975 – Mike Brant, Israeli singer and songwriter (b.1947)
1976 – Carol Reed, English director and producer (b. 1906)
  1976   – Markus Reiner, Israeli engineer and educator (b. 1886)
1982 – John Cody, American cardinal (b. 1907)
1983 – William S. Bowdern, American priest and author (b. 1897)
1988 – Carolyn Franklin, American singer-songwriter (b. 1944)
  1988   – Clifford D. Simak, American journalist and author (b. 1904)
1990 – Dexter Gordon, American saxophonist, composer, and actor (b. 1923)
1992 – Yutaka Ozaki, Japanese singer-songwriter (b. 1965)
1995 – Art Fleming, American game show host (b. 1925)
  1995   – Ginger Rogers, American actress, singer, and dancer (b. 1911)
  1995   – Lev Shankovsky, Ukrainian military historian (b. 1903)
1996 – Saul Bass, American graphic designer and director (b. 1920)
1998 – Wright Morris, American author and photographer (b. 1910)
1999 – Michael Morris, 3rd Baron Killanin, Irish journalist and author (b. 1914)
  1999   – Roger Troutman, American singer-songwriter and producer (b. 1951)
2000 – Lucien Le Cam, French mathematician and statistician (b. 1924)
  2000   – David Merrick, American director and producer (b. 1911)
2001 – Michele Alboreto, Italian racing driver (b. 1956)
2002 – Lisa Lopes, American rapper and dancer (b. 1971)
2003 – Samson Kitur, Kenyan runner (b. 1966)
2004 – Thom Gunn, English-American poet and academic (b. 1929)
2005 – Jim Barker, American politician (b. 1935)
  2005   – Swami Ranganathananda, Indian monk and educator (b. 1908)
2006 – Jane Jacobs, American-Canadian journalist, author, and activist (b. 1916)
  2006   – Peter Law, Welsh politician and independent member of parliament (b. 1948)
2007 – Alan Ball Jr., English footballer and manager (b. 1945)
  2007   – Arthur Milton, English footballer and cricketer (b. 1928)
  2007   – Bobby Pickett, American singer-songwriter (b. 1938)
2008 – Humphrey Lyttelton, English trumpet player, composer, and radio host (b. 1921)
2009 – Bea Arthur, American actress and singer (b. 1922)
2010 – Dorothy Provine, American actress and singer (b. 1935)
  2010   – Alan Sillitoe, English novelist, short story writer, essayist, and poet (b. 1928)
2011 – Poly Styrene, British musician (b. 1957)
2012 – Gerry Bahen, Australian footballer (b. 1929)
  2012   – Denny Jones, American rancher and politician (b. 1910)
  2012   – Moscelyne Larkin, American ballerina and educator (b. 1925)
  2012   – Louis le Brocquy, Irish painter and illustrator (b. 1916)
2013 – Brian Adam, Scottish biochemist and politician (b. 1948)
  2013   – Jacob Avshalomov, American composer and conductor (b. 1919)
  2013   – György Berencsi, Hungarian virologist and academic (b. 1941)
  2013   – Rick Camp, American baseball player (b. 1953)
2014 – Dan Heap, Canadian priest and politician (b. 1925)
  2014   – William Judson Holloway Jr., American soldier, lawyer, and judge (b. 1923)
  2014   – Earl Morrall, American football player and coach (b. 1934)
  2014   – Tito Vilanova, Spanish footballer and manager (b. 1968)
  2014   – Stefanie Zweig, German journalist and author (b. 1932)
2015 – Jim Fanning, American-Canadian baseball player and manager (b. 1927)
  2015   – Matthias Kuhle, German geographer and academic (b. 1948)
  2015   – Don Mankiewicz, American screenwriter and novelist (b. 1922)
  2015   – Mike Phillips, American basketball player (b. 1956)
2016 – Tom Lewis, Australian politician, 33rd Premier of New South Wales (b. 1922)
2018 – Madeeha Gauhar, Pakistani actress, playwright and director of social theater, and women's rights activist (b. 1956)
2019 – John Havlicek, American basketball player (b. 1940)

Holidays and observances
 Anzac Day (Australia, New Zealand, Tonga)
 Christian feast day:
 Giovanni Battista Piamarta
 Major Rogation (Western Christianity)
 Mark the Evangelist
 Maughold
 Peter of Saint Joseph de Betancur
 Philo and Agathopodes
 Anianus of Alexandria
 April 25 (Eastern Orthodox liturgics)
 World Malaria Day

References

External links

 BBC: On This Day
 
 Historical Events on April 25

Days of the year
April